Haja Umu Hawa Tejan-Jalloh, GCOR (born April 16, 1949 ) is a Sierra Leonean lawyer who was the first female Chief Justice of Sierra Leone from 2008 to 2015.

Early life and background
She was born on April 16, 1949  and grew up in the Sierra Leonean capital Freetown to Muslim parents from the Fula ethnic group, originally from Koinadugu District in the north part of Sierra Leone. Like her parents, Umu Hawa Tejan-Jalloh is also a Muslim, unlike her great grandmother on the maternal side who was a Methodist Christian hailed from Koya Chiefdom (then Koya Kingdom) in the Port Loko District. She is the older sister of Sierra Leonean diplomat Sulaiman Tejan-Jalloh. Jalloh's mother was the President of the Sierra Leone National Fullah Women’s Association for twenty six years; and her father served in the Freetown City Council.

Education

She attended the Harford Secondary School for Girls in Moyamba, Moyamba District and the St. Edward's Secondary School in Freetown. After her secondary education, she gained admission to Columbia University in New York City, New York, United States where she graduated with a Bachelor of Arts degree (History  and Political Science). Following her graduation from Columbia in 1971, she commenced a Bachelor of Laws (LLB) degree at the College of Law, London, and in 1974 undertook her post finals at the Council of Legal Education in London. In November of the same year, she was called to the Bar of the Honorable Society of Gray's Inn, London.

Career

In 1975, she was appointed as a State Counsel in the Sierra Leone Ministry of Justice. She was later promoted to senior State Counsel and Principal State Council. In 1996 she was appointed as a High Court Judge, where she served until 2004, when she was appointed as a Court of Appeals Judge. She remained in that position until she was appointed as the Supreme Court's Chief Justice  in 2008.

She was sworn in as Sierra Leone's Chief Justice on January 25, 2008, succeeding retired  Chief Justice Ade Renner Thomas.  She was the first woman to hold the Chief Justice position in Sierra Leone's history .

She proceeded on leave to retirement on 6 February 2015 , with Valesius Thomas as acting Chief Justice, until finally being replaced by Abdulai Hamid Charm on 25 January 2016.

Honors
  Sierra Leone: Grand Commander of the Order of the Rokel (2008)

See also 
 First women lawyers around the world

References 
 http://www.news.sl/drwebsite/publish/article_20057492.shtml
http://news.sl/drwebsite/exec/view.cgi?archive=1&num=10876

1949 births
Alumni of the University of London
Chief justices of Sierra Leone
Columbia Law School alumni
Living people
Njala University alumni
People from Freetown
Sierra Leonean Fula people
Sierra Leonean Muslims
Women chief justices